The postal history of San Marino can be traced to October 7, 1607, with the introduction of public postal services. The republic's postal needs were handled by a post office in nearby Rimini, Italy; the first San Marino post office opened in 1833.

History 
When postage stamps were introduced in the mid-19th century, San Marino signed a postal treaty with Italy to use Italian stamps for its mail. On March 2, 1877, a new agreement was signed between the two countries that enabled San Marino to issue its own stamps.

The first San Marino postage stamps were a definitive stamps consisting of two designs covering seven denominations. The stamps, which depicted the coat of arms of the republic with the Three Towers of San Marino at Monte Titano (except the 2-centesimi stamp), were created by the design firm Fratelli Pellas in Genoa and printed on Italian watermarked paper by the Officina Carta e Valori in Turin. The first Commemorative stamps were introduced in 1894.

Over the years, the attractive designs and unusual shapes – many are triangularly shaped – of San Marino's stamps have been extremely popular with philatelists around the world. It is estimated that 10% of the republic's revenue is generated by the sale of its postage stamps to international collectors. The government of San Marino has the world's only philatelic minister of state, Simone Celli, who carries the title (in Italian) La Segreteria di Stato per le finanze, il bilancio e la programmazione, l'informazione, i rapporti con l'azienda autonoma di stato filatelica e numismatica (State Secretariat for Finance, Budget and Planning, Information, Relations with the Autonomous Philatelic and Numismatic Company).

List of people on stamps of San Marino 

Luciano Pavarotti, operatic tenor (2010)
Andrea Palladio, architect (2008)
Concetto Marchesi, freedom fighter (2008)

Further reading
 Balsimelli, Francesco. Posta, francobollo, filatelia con particolare riguardo alla Repubblica di San Marino. Milan: Pubblicazioni rotariane, 1970 19p.  
 Colla, Giorgio and Luigi Sirotti. Storia Postale: Repubblica di San Marino: dall'epoca napoleonica al 1892. Rome: Sassone; Dogana: Filatelia Sammarinese, 2001 171p.
 Filanci, Franco and Alessandro Glaray. Il servizio postale della Repubblica di San Marino. s.l.: Sirotti, 1977 279p.
 Glaray, Alessandro and Franco Filanci. Repubblica di San Marino: storia postale dalle origini alla fine dell'800. Turin: Notiziario ASIF, 1972 142p.
 Morganti, Giuseppe. La Filatelia. San Marino: AIEP; Rimini: Guaraldi, 1993 31p.
 Repubblica di San Marino: catalogo dei francobolli 1877 - 1988. San Marino: Azienda Autonoma di Stato Filatelica e Numismatica, 1989 127p.

See also

Poste San Marino, the current Post Office.

References

External links
 Catalogue of meter stamps of San Marino on Wikibooks
 Philatelic Database ex Stamp News Australasia
 UFN, Ufficio Filatelico Numismatico

Communications in San Marino
Philately of San Marino